Grylloblattella is a genus of insects in the family Grylloblattidae found in the Altai-Sayan region of Central Asia. It contains 3 species restricted to montane environments in southern Siberia (Russia), China, and Kazakhstan.

Species
These species belong to the genus Grylloblattella:

Grylloblattella cheni Bai, Wang & Yang 2010 – type locality: Ake Kule Lake, Xinjiang, China
Grylloblattella pravdini Storozhenko & Oliger 1984 – type locality: Teletskoye Lake, Russia
Grylloblattella sayanensis Storozhenko 1996 – type locality: Sambyl Pass, Russia

Habitat
They are found in rocky streams and talus fields, including low-elevation microhabitats that are cold and humid. Unlike some other grylloblattids, they have not been found at montane sites.

Grylloblattella forage on snowfields at night. They are also often also active during the day in rocky habitats.

References

Grylloblattidae
Insects of Russia
Insects of China
Fauna of Kazakhstan